Latario Collie-Minns (born March 10, 1994) is a Bahamian triple jumper. He won the gold medal at the 2011 World Youth Championships in Lille, France, and eventually represented his nation Bahamas at the 2016 Summer Olympics, scratching all three of his jumps in the preliminary round. In his college career, Collie-Minns established history as the fifth Bahamian to capture the NCAA men's triple jump title for the Texas A&M Aggies.

Collie-Minns competed for the Bahamas in the men's triple jump at the 2016 Summer Olympics in Rio de Janeiro. Leading up to his maiden Games, he popped a personal best of 17.18 m to successfully eclipse the IAAF Olympic entry standard (16.85) at the 2015 Southeastern Conference Track & Field Championships in Starkville, Mississippi, United States. Collie-Minns could not get down a legal mark in each of the three available attempts during the qualifying phase of the competition, failing to advance further to the final round.

Collie-Minns has a twin brother named Lathone, who finished behind him for the silver medal in the triple jump at the 2011 World Youth Championships.

Competition record

References

External links
 

Bahamian male triple jumpers
Living people
Sportspeople from Nassau, Bahamas
1994 births
World Athletics Championships athletes for the Bahamas
Athletes (track and field) at the 2015 Pan American Games
Athletes (track and field) at the 2019 Pan American Games
Pan American Games competitors for the Bahamas
Athletes (track and field) at the 2016 Summer Olympics
Athletes (track and field) at the 2018 Commonwealth Games
Olympic athletes of the Bahamas
Commonwealth Games competitors for the Bahamas
Olympic male triple jumpers